National Museums Liverpool, formerly National Museums and Galleries on Merseyside, comprises several museums and art galleries in and around Liverpool, England. All the museums and galleries in the group have free admission. The museum is a non-departmental public body sponsored by the Department for Culture, Media and Sport and an exempt charity under English law.

In the 1980s, local politics in Liverpool was under the control of the Militant group of the Labour Party. In 1986, Liverpool's Militant councillors discussed closing down the city's museums and selling off their contents, in particular their art collections. To prevent this from happening the Conservative government nationalised all of Liverpool's museums under the Merseyside Museums and Galleries Order 1986 which created a new national trustee body National Museums and Galleries on Merseyside. It changed its name to National Museums Liverpool in 2003.

It holds in trust multi-disciplinary collections of worldwide origin made up of more than one million objects and works of art. The organisation holds courses, lectures, activities and events and provides educational workshops and activities for school children, young people and adults. It's venues are open to the public six days a week, from Tuesday to Sunday, providing both free and ticketed exhibitions. National Museums Liverpool has charitable status and is England’s only national museums group based entirely outside London. It currently comprises eight different venues, one of which is outside Liverpool itself — the Lady Lever Art Gallery, located in Port Sunlight.

Museums and art galleries

References

External links 
 National Museums Liverpool website
 National Museums Liverpool blog

 
1851 establishments in England
Museums sponsored by the Department for Digital, Culture, Media and Sport
Musical instrument museums in England
Non-departmental public bodies of the United Kingdom government
Exempt charities
Charities based in Merseyside
Organisations based in Liverpool
Research organisations in England